Shaista Khan Mosque is a historically significant architectural monument situated by the Buriganga River at Mitford Area in old Dhaka, Bangladesh. The mosque is an architecture of Mughal period. The mosque was built by Mughal Subahdar of Bengal, Shaista Khan.

History
Subahdar Shaista Khan built this small mosque at the bank of river Buriganga. Shaista Khan was the Mughal subahdar who ruled the Bengal from 1664 to 1688. The exact date of the building of this mosque is not known, but it is assumed that it was built when Subahdar Shaista Khan first came to Dhaka in 1664.  It is supposed to be built between 1663 and 1678, the first viceroyalty of Khan. During the British period the mosque was seriously damaged by an accidental fire. Recently the mosque has been repaired and has lost its original look.

An old inscription in Persian fixed over the doorway still stands today, declaring that Shaista Khan erected the mosque. Other details including the dates are unclear.

Architecture

The mosque is 14.13m x 7.62m in dimension. The mosque has three domes and four octagonal towers. The central dome is larger than the others. It has three doors in east side and one each on north and south sides. All the door are arched.

Present condition
At present this three domed mosque is still structurally strong and it is lost among the huge structure of Mitford hospital. Though it is ill-treated by the local people it bears a significant sign of the age of Shaista Khan. The original look of the mosque has vanished. The ornamental works of surface is now plastered and painted green.

See also
 List of mosques in Bangladesh

References 

Mosques in Dhaka
Mughal mosques